Saudi or Saudi Arabian may refer to:

 Saudi Arabia 
 Saudis, people from Saudi Arabia
 Saudi culture, the culture of Saudi Arabia
 House of Saud, the ruling family of Saudi Arabia